Luca Leggiero (born 11 November 1984), is an Italian futsal player who plays for Pescara Calcio a 5 and the Italian national futsal team.

References

External links
UEFA profile

1984 births
Living people
People from Monopoli
Italian men's futsal players
Sportspeople from the Metropolitan City of Bari